The Morton Brothers Grocery, located at 401 West Ninth in Houston, Texas, is a historic building located in the Houston Heights neighborhood.  Built in 1929, it was a neighborhood grocery store run by Curtiss I. Morton and his brother, William J. Morton until 1949. It is a one-story brick veneer commercial building, one of the few such remaining in the Heights.  Its most recent use has been as a private home.  It was listed on the National Register of Historic Places on January 15, 1988.

See also
 National Register of Historic Places listings in Harris County, Texas

References

National Register of Historic Places in Houston
Commercial buildings on the National Register of Historic Places in Texas